Kelsey-Colin Kass Egan  (born 20 March 1983) is an American-South African filmmaker, actress, and stunt performer. She founded the Cape Town-based production company Crave Pictures. Her short film Gargoyle (2009) and science fiction film Glasshouse  (2021) were nominated for SAFTAs.

Early and personal life
Egan is from Wisconsin and attended Whitefish Bay High School. She took a course at the British American Drama Academy in London. She double majored in Drama and Neuroscience and Behavior at Vassar College, graduating in 2005. She briefly lived in New York City and Beijing before moving to Johannesburg in 2008. She holds dual citizenship.

Career

Filmmaking
To gain experience in the industry, Egan decided to begin her career working both in front of the camera and on sets behind the scenes. She was a production assistant for the documentary Trumbo (2007) and the films I Am Legend (2007), Stop-Loss (2008), and Deception (2008), and a production coordinator for the films Mr. Bones 2: Back from the Past (2008) and Gugu and Andile (2008) as well as the Sky One series Strike Back (2011). She was a script supervisor for Neill Blomkamp's District 9 (2009).

Egan's first short film Gargoyle, filmed in 2008, was nominated for Best Short Film at the 2010 South African Film and Television Awards. Her other short films include 21th Street (2010), Red Herring (2014), The Bull (2018), and The Fighter (2019).

Egan was a VFX producer for the 2014 adaptation of The Giver and cast assistant on the sets of the films Eye in the Sky (2015) and The Dark Tower (2017). She wrote on seven episodes of the 2018 children's animated series Munki and Trunk as well as on the 2019 M-Net crime thriller miniseries Trackers.

While The Fix was postponed, Egan began collaborating with screenwriter Emma Lungiswa de Wet on a slate of three "grounded" science fiction films for Local Motion Pictures. The first of the slate Glasshouse was written over Zoom during the COVID-19 lockdown and filmed on location in the Eastern Cape in late 2020. The film premiered at the 2021 Fantasia Film Festival, officially marking Egan's feature directorial debut, followed by a wide release in 2022. Glasshouse received six nominations at the South African Film and Television Awards that year, including Best Feature Film, winning five of them.

Egan's upcoming titles include The Fix, Outer Edges, and the latter two films in her slate with Lungiswa de Wet.

Acting and stunt work
Egan first did stunt work for Death Race 3: Inferno. She made her television debut in 2012 as a stunt performer in the Channel 4 historical miniseries Labyrinth. She played Nicole Weiss in the 2013 crime film Zulu. For Mad Max: Fury Road, Egan alongside the other stunt performers won the Screen Actors Guild Award for Outstanding Stunt Ensemble. She was Claire Foy's stunt double in the first season of The Crown on Netflix and Jane de Wet's in the BBC America adaptation of Terry Pratchett's The Watch. She played Honey in the dark comedy film Fried Barry and Siri in the Afrikaans romantic comedy Kaalgat Karel.

Filmography

Filmmaking

Acting and stunt work

Other credits

References

External links

Living people
1983 births
American emigrants to South Africa
Naturalised citizens of South Africa
People from Whitefish Bay, Wisconsin
American women film directors
Women stunt performers
Vassar College alumni
South African women film directors
American women film producers
South African women film producers